In computability theory, the Turing jump or Turing jump operator, named for Alan Turing, is an operation that assigns to each decision problem  a successively harder decision problem  with the property that  is not decidable by an oracle machine with an oracle for .

The operator is called a jump operator because it increases the Turing degree of the problem . Post's theorem establishes a relationship between the Turing jump operator and the arithmetical hierarchy of sets of natural numbers. Informally, given a problem, the Turing jump returns the set of Turing machines that halt when given access to an oracle that solves that problem.

Definition 
The Turing jump of X can be thought of as an oracle to the halting problem for oracle machines with an oracle for X.

 

The th Turing jump  is defined inductively by
 
 

 

where  denotes the th prime.

It is read zero-jump or sometimes zero-prime.

Similarly,  is the th jump of the empty set. For finite , these sets are closely related to the arithmetic hierarchy, and is in particular connected to Post's theorem.

Beyond , the process can be continued through the countable ordinals of the constructible universe, using Jensen's work on fine structure theory of Godel's L.  The concept has also been generalized to extend to uncountable regular cardinals.

Examples 

 The Turing jump  of the empty set is Turing equivalent to the halting problem.
 For each , the set  is m-complete at level  in the arithmetical hierarchy (by Post's theorem).

Properties 

  is -computably enumerable but not -computable.
The converse of this implication is not true.

Many properties of the Turing jump operator are discussed in the article on Turing degrees.

References

Ambos-Spies, K. and Fejer, P.  Degrees of Unsolvability.  Unpublished. http://www.cs.umb.edu/~fejer/articles/History_of_Degrees.pdf

Year of introduction missing
Computability theory
Alan Turing